The 1990–91 Cypriot Second Division was the 36th season of the Cypriot second-level football league. Evagoras won their 5th title.

Format
Fourteen teams participated in the 1990–91 Cypriot Second Division. All teams played against each other twice, once at their home and once away. The team with the most points at the end of the season crowned champions. The first two teams were promoted to 1991–92 Cypriot First Division. The last two teams were relegated to the 1991–92 Cypriot Third Division.

The 3rd-placed team faced the 12th-placed team of the 1990–91 Cypriot First Division, in a two-legged relegation play-off for one spot in the 1991–92 Cypriot First Division. The 12th-placed team faced the 3rd-placed team of the 1990–91 Cypriot Third Division, in a two-legged relegation play-off for one spot in the 1991–92 Cypriot Second Division.

Changes from previous season
Teams promoted to 1990–91 Cypriot First Division
 EPA Larnaca
 APEP

Teams relegated from 1989–90 Cypriot First Division
 Evagoras Paphos
 Ethnikos Achna

Teams promoted from 1989–90 Cypriot Third Division
 APEP Pelendriou
 Ermis Aradippou

Teams relegated to 1990–91 Cypriot Third Division
 AEZ Zakakiou
 Keravnos
 Digenis Ipsona

League standings

Playoff

Promotion playoff
The 3rd-placed team, Ethnikos Achna, faced the 12th-placed team of the 1990–91 Cypriot First Division, Enosis Neon Paralimni, in a two-legged relegation play-off for one spot in the 1991–92 Cypriot First Division. Enosis Neon Paralimni won both matches and secured their place in the 1991–92 Cypriot First Division.

Enosis Neon Paralimni 4–0 Ethnikos Achna
Ethnikos Achna 1–3 Enosis Neon Paralimni

Relegation playoff
The 12th-placed team, Ermis Aradippou, faced the 3rd-placed team of the 1990–91 Cypriot Third Division, Apollon Lympion, in a two-legged relegation play-off for one spot in the 1991–92 Cypriot Second Division. Apollon Lympion won the playoff and secured their place in the 1991–92 Cypriot Second Division.

Ermis Aradippou 0–1 Apollon Lympion
Apollon Lympion 1–1 Ermis Aradippou

See also
 Cypriot Second Division
 1990–91 Cypriot First Division
 1990–91 Cypriot Cup

Sources

Cypriot Second Division seasons
Cyprus
1990–91 in Cypriot football